RK Zagreb (full name Ragbi klub Zagreb, English: Rugby Club Zagreb) is a rugby union club from Zagreb, Croatia. It participates in the Croatian Rugby Championship, the Croatian Rugby Cup and the Interleague. The club was founded on February 16, 1964.

Club offices are situated at Kranjčevićeva 4, Zagreb.

The club won the Rugby Championship of Yugoslavia six times, and won the Croatian rugby championship twice.

Trophies

Championships
 Croatian: 
- winners 2: 1993/94, 2000/01
 Yugoslav:
- winners 6: 1974/75, 1975/76, 1976/77, 1977/78, 1979/80, 1980/81

Cups
Croatian cup: 
- winners 3: 1996, 2002, 2003 
Yugoslav cup: 
- winners 2: 1974, 1980

Interleague: 
- champions 1: 2005/06

External links 
 RK Zagreb website

Croatian rugby union teams
Rugby clubs established in 1964
Sports teams in Zagreb